Ryan Holman (born 5 July 1986) is a Dutch former professional footballer who played as a defender.

Career
Born in The Hague, Holman began his youth career with DHC Delft before joining the Feyenoord youth academy in 1996.
Failing to break through to the first team, he joined Willem II, where he made his professional debut in the 2005–06 season. He afterwards played for HFC Haarlem, before focusing on his studies and playing amateur football in the lower tiers for Ter Leede, BVV Barendrecht and GVVV. In March 2020, he played his last football match as part of Tweede Klasse club De Merino's before retiring.

References

1986 births
Living people
Footballers from The Hague
Association football defenders
Dutch footballers
Dutch people of Indonesian descent
Willem II (football club) players
Ter Leede players
Netherlands youth international footballers
DHC Delft players
Feyenoord players
HFC Haarlem players
BVV Barendrecht players
GVVV players
Vierde Divisie players
Derde Divisie players
Eredivisie players
Eerste Divisie players